Verizon Wireless Amphitheater(re), Verizon Wireless Music Center(re), Verizon Wireless Theatre(er), and other variants may refer to:

The following venues were formerly known by the Verizon-sponsored names:
Verizon Wireless Music Center (Alabama), now Oak Mountain Amphitheatre, in Pelham, Alabama
Verizon Wireless Amphitheatre Irvine, now Irvine Meadows Amphitheatre in Irvine, California
Verizon Amphitheatre, in Alpharetta, Georgia now Ameris Bank Amphitheatre.
Verizon Wireless Theater, now Revention Music Center, in Houston
Verizon Wireless Music Center (Indiana), now Ruoff Music Center, in Noblesville, Indiana
Verizon Wireless Amphitheatre Kansas City, in Bonner Springs, Kansas
Verizon Wireless Amphitheater St. Louis, now Hollywood Casino Amphitheatre in Maryland Heights, Missouri
Verizon Wireless Amphitheatre Charlotte, now PNC Music Pavilion, in Charlotte, North Carolina
Verizon Theatre at Grand Prairie in Grand Prairie, Texas, now known as The Theatre at Grand Prairie
Verizon Wireless Amphitheater (Selma, Texas) in Selma, Texas, now owned by River City Community Church
Verizon Wireless Amphitheater at Virginia Beach, now Veterans United Home Loans Amphitheater, in Virginia Beach, Virginia